Meng Fanli (born September 1965) is a Chinese politician who is the current party secretary of Shenzhen and deputy party secretary of Guangdong, in office since April 2022. He is a delegate to the 13th National People's Congress.

Biography
Meng was born in Linyi County (now Linyi), Shandong, in September 1965. In 1982, he entered Shandong University of Finance and Economics, majoring in business accounting. After graduating in 1986, he taught at the university. He received his master's degree in western accounting in 1995 from Nankai University and doctor's degree in accounting in 1998 from Tianjin University of Finance and Economics.

Meng joined the Chinese Communist Party (CCP) in March 1986, and got involved in politics in June 2000, when he was appointed deputy director of Shandong Provincial Department of Finance. In July 2005, he became deputy party secretary of Shandong Luxin Investment Holding Co., Ltd., rising to party secretary in July 2009. In March 2013, he became director of Shandong Provincial Department of Commerce, but having held the position for only three months. He served as mayor of Yantai from 2013 to 2015, and party secretary, the top political position in the city, from 2015 to 2017. It would be his first job as "first-in-charge" of a city. In March 2017, he was promoted to acting mayor of Qingdao, confirmed in April.

In September 2020, he was transferred to north China's Inner Mongolia, where he was appointed party secretary of Baotou and was admitted to member of the standing committee of the CCP Inner Mongolia Regional Committee, the region's top authority. In November 2021, he became deputy party secretary of Inner Mongolia.

In April 2022, he was despatched to south China's Guangdong province and appointed party secretary of Shenzhen and deputy party secretary of Guangdong.

References

1965 births
Living people
People from Linyi
Shandong University of Finance and Economics alumni
Nankai University alumni
Tianjin University of Finance and Economics alumni
Mayors of Qingdao
Academic staff of Shandong University of Finance and Economics
People's Republic of China politicians from Shandong
Chinese Communist Party politicians from Shandong
Delegates to the 13th National People's Congress